Benito Pocino (born 21 March 1958), is a Spanish actor.

Benito Pocino was born in Barcelona on 21 March 1958. He used to read Mortadelo y Filemón comics, and his classmates gave him the nickname Mortadelo due to his appearance. He works as mailman in Correos.

He is known for playing Mortadelo in La gran aventura de Mortadelo y Filemón (2003). He was replaced by Edu Soto in the sequel Mortadelo y Filemón. Misión: salvar la Tierra (2008), and by Karra Elejalde in Mortadelo y Filemón contra Jimmy el Cachondo (2014). He appeared in Rumores (2007) with Xavi Mira, Núria Prims and Ana Risueño.

Filmography
 El sulfato anatómico (2016)
 Chaval, videoclip de La señora de González
 No es un concepto nuevo, videoclip de Soulfood
 Déjate caer (2007)
 Rumores (2007)
 La máquina de bailar (2006)
 Platillos volantes (2003)
 La gran aventura de Mortadelo y Filemón (2003)
 Feliz aniversario (1998)
 El viatger (1998)
 Adiós, tiburón (1996)
 El caso de los falsos doctores (1996)
 Atolladero (1995)
 Don Jaume, el conquistador (1994)
 Historias de la puta mili (1994)
 Makinavaja (1994) (serie de TV)
 Semos peligrosos (uséase Makinavaja 2) (1993)
 Makinavaja, el último choriso (1992)
 Sinatra (1988)
 Angustia (1987)

References

External links

 

1958 births
Male actors from Barcelona
Male film actors from Catalonia
Bakers
Mail carriers
Living people
20th-century Spanish male actors
21st-century Spanish male actors